The Peña Montañesa is a conspicuous rocky mountainous outcrop of the Pre-Pyrenees. It is located east of the valley of the Cinca, in the Sobrarbe comarca, Aragon, Spain. The ridge's highest summit is 2295 m high. The village of Laspuña is located at the feet of the mountain.

The summits on the mountain offer excellent views of some of the main peaks of the Pyrenees in the north. 

The Peña Montañesa was one of the strongholds of Spanish Republican resistance against invading troops supporting General Franco during the Bolsa de Bielsa episode.

The ruins of the Real Monasterio de San Victorián are located in El Pueyo de Araguás, at the foot of the Peña Montañesa.

See also
Real Monasterio de San Victorián
Mountains of Aragon

References

External links

 Ruta de Puntos de Interés Geológico - Turismo Sobrarbe; Naturaleza
Itinerario Geológico - Geoparque de Sobrarbe
Escuela de Escalada y Técnicas verticales El Tormo

Mountains of Aragon
Pre-Pyrenees
Two-thousanders of Spain